Basket Ball Club Union Sportive Hiefenech was founded in 1959 in the small town of Heffingen, Luxembourg.

History 
The golden era of the club came in the late 1980s and lasted until the early 2000s. The team won four national leagues and four cups.

Honours 

Luxembourgian League
 Winners (4): 1988–89, 1989–90, 1990–91, 1995-96
Luxembourgian Cup
 Winners (4): 1993–94, 1994–95, 1997–98, 1999-00

References

External links 
 BBC US Hiefenech site

Basketball teams established in 1959
Basketball teams in Luxembourg